5 News at 5, also known as Channel 5 News, is the news programme of British broadcaster Channel 5, produced by ITN from its main newsroom on Gray's Inn Road, London.

History
5 News was one of the new station's flagship programmes when it launched on 30 March 1997. One of the launch newsreaders was Rob Butler, who became MP for Aylesbury in 2019. It was originally produced by ITN, which at the time also provided the news for Channel 4 and ITV. It was announced on 9 March 2004 that Sky had won the new contract to provide Channel 5 with its news bulletins.

The first Sky-produced bulletin was planned for 3 January 2005 but the 2004 Indian Ocean earthquake and tsunami brought this forward two days in a short Saturday evening update. In January 2009, the contract with Sky was extended to 2012.

Five News pioneered a number of innovations in style, format and content of news and won numerous awards in its early years.

Originally provided by ITN, from 1 January 2005, Sky News took over the contract to provide the news for Channel 5, replacing ITN, which had provided the channel's news service from the channel's launch in 1997. On 14 February 2011, the service was rebranded back to its original name, 5 News, having been called Five News from 2002 until 2011. On 20 February 2012 the contract returned to original provider ITN.
 
On 18 February 2008, Five News was given a refreshed look with new theme music, and titles, the titles were later refreshed in October of that year to coincide with Five's rebrand. The 7pm edition was also rebranded Five News at 7 and saw the return of presenters standing up to read the news.  On 10 August 2009, Channel 5 announced that its Five News at 7 programme would be axed in the autumn of 2009 along with newscaster Isla Traquair, who had presented it. On 28 August 2009, at the end of the programme, Isla announced that it was her last appearance, and on 4 September, Matt Barbet presented the last programme. Five News at 7 was replaced by the hour-long Live from Studio Five, a nightly magazine programme featuring a mix of news and chat, airing from 6:30pm weeknights, from 14 September 2009. The show rivalled the BBC One programme The One Show.

In November 2009, James Partridge of facial disfigurement charity Changing Faces presented the lunchtime news bulletins all week.

On 2 August 2010, Five News at 7 was reinstated, after a change of ownership of the channel. Live from Studio Five was cut to 30 minutes as a result.

On 14 October 2010, Natasha Kaplinsky announced that she was leaving Channel 5 at the end of 2010, having spent much of her three years at the broadcaster on maternity leave.

In February 2011, Emma Crosby was appointed as Kaplinsky's replacement and presenter of the 7pm bulletin, with Barbet hosting the 5pm edition. The service was relaunched as 5 News on 14 February 2011 to match Channel 5's rebranding, with Crosby making her first appearance.

On the 2 September 2011 it was announced that David Kermode, at-the-time editor, would leave 5 News in order to take up an editorial spot on Daybreak. He was replaced by Geoff Hill.

On 9 January 2012, due to the production handover from Sky News to ITN, the 7pm edition of 5 News was moved to the earlier timeslot of 6:30pm in place of the axed OK! TV.  The ITN produced 5 News bulletins relaunched on 20 February 2012 with newscasters Matt Barbet and Emma Crosby retaining their roles as lead newscasters.  The bulletin's website and social media offerings were also relaunched at this time.

On 11 June 2012 it was announced Matt Barbet would leave 5 News to join ITV's Daybreak. He left on 26 July 2012 with Emma Crosby now presenting both editions.

In September 2013, ITN announced that Geoff Hill was to leave 5 News to become the new Editor of ITV News. The following month ITN announced that ITV News' Head of Output, Cristina Nicolotti Squires would become the new Editor of 5 News in November 2013.

On 16 April 2014, it was announced on Twitter that following Matt Barbet's departure from Daybreak, he would be returning to 5 News and ITN to present 5 News Tonight – a new show at 6:30pm, replacing NewsTalk Live, on 28 April 2014. Emma Crosby would continue to present 5 News at 5pm.

On 5 November 2015, Emma Crosby announced she was leaving 5 News after five  years to have a baby. Sian Williams from BBC News was to replace her in early 2016.

On 31 October 2016, a new look for 5 News was aired. The 5 News team went back to their old home at the ITN building. The new studio and set included the desk in the shape of a 5.

Until March 2009, Channel 5 had a dedicated team of weather presenters. Sky News weather presenters then provided forecasts for the channel. This changed in November 2010 when Sian Welby joined Channel 5 as weather presenter, with former BBC and ITV meteorologist Kirsty McCabe providing cover.

As of October 2016, Channel 5 Weather is in partnership with the Met Office, with former GMTV weather presenter Clare Nasir fronting forecasts.

In September 2021, Ofcom approved the removal of the 6.30pm news slot by Channel 5 in order for the ViacomCBS channel to schedule Neighbours at 6pm and Eggheads at 6.30pm with a new hour long 5 News programme going out on the channel at 5pm.  Ofcom's approval of the channel's new conditions recognised that there will be still three-hours of news between 5-8pm over all the main public service broadcasters' channels, and that Channel 5 was still committed to delivering more than 280 hours of news each year.

5 News relaunch (2021)
The relaunched hour long-version of 5 News was broadcast on Channel 5 for the first time on 8 November 2021 at 5pm, with the programme still produced for the channel by ITN. It was initially presented by Sian Williams and Claudia-Liza Vanderpuije, with a live reporting team across the UK and a direct WhatsApp link to the presenters, so viewers can get in touch. Channel 5 hopes the relaunched news show will complement the Jeremy Vine programme shown each weekday morning and will be equally vibrant.

In March 2022, five months after the 5 News relaunched as an hour-long format, Broadcast reported that Sian Williams will step down as one of the main presenters after six years. Williams will still present one-off programmes made by ITN for Channel 5 and will continue to be involved with the  Mind Matters with Dr Sian feature on 5 News.

On 4 April 2022, Dan Walker was confirmed to be joining the show replacing Sian Williams and would be leaving BBC Breakfast.

On-air team

News presenters

Weather presenters

Correspondents

Features
 5 News originally provided afternoon and evening updates on the hour, every hour during the week.
 A 'ticker' was used during these updates, the first seen on a terrestrial news broadcast, outside of a simulcast with a news channel. This was switched to a weather ticker before being dropped entirely in 2007.
 A presenter standing up or 'perching' rather than sitting behind a desk (which has since been used by other broadcasters). This feature was banned by the channel in 2007, with presenters at the seating area for all bulletins, although the presenters stood again when 5 News was relaunched in February 2011. 
 On air 'teases' from production staff
 Live discussions involving various experts, campaigners, celebrities and political commentators
 Guest editors – these included Ms. Dynamite, Dame Kelly Holmes, Howard Marks and Alastair Campbell
 Your News, a segment of most bulletins given over to viewers' videos and now adapted by many other news programmes under the banner 'user-generated content'
 On-screen email addresses were shown for reporters while they're on air, a feature previously seen in newspapers. This was dropped a few months after introduction.
 When the contract transferred to Sky News, Five News was the first programme to broadcast (and, for the first time, in widescreen) from the news centre at Sky's headquarters in Osterley.

References

External links

1997 British television series debuts
1997 establishments in the United Kingdom
2000s British television series
2010s British television series
2020s British television series
Breakfast television in the United Kingdom
British television news shows
News
News
English-language television shows
ITN
Sky News